Verdens Gang ("The course of the world"), generally known under the abbreviation VG, is a Norwegian tabloid newspaper. In 2016, circulation numbers stood at 93,883, having declined from a peak circulation of 390,510 in 2002. VG is nevertheless the most read online newspaper in Norway, with about 2 million daily readers.

Verdens Gang AS is a private company wholly owned by the public company Schibsted.

History and profile
VG was established by members of the Norwegian resistance movement shortly after the country was liberated from German occupation in 1945. The first issue of the paper was published on 23 June 1945. Christian A. R. Christensen was the first editor-in-chief of VG from its start in 1945 to 1967 when he died.

VG is based in Oslo. The paper is published in tabloid format. The owner is the media conglomerate Schibsted, which also owns Norway's largest newspaper, Aftenposten, as well as newspapers in Sweden and Estonia and shares in some of Norway's larger regional newspapers. Schibsted took over the paper following the death of Christensen in 1967. Just before the change in the ownership VG was mostly sold in the Oslo area and had a circulation of 34,000 copies.

The editor-in-chief is Gard Steiro. VG is not affiliated with any political party.

For many years, VG was the largest newspaper in Norway by circulation, which reached a peak of 390,000 in 2002. As its readers moved from the traditional newspaper to internet newspapers, the circulation has collapsed to 94,000 in 2016. VG is now the second largest print newspaper in Norway. It was overtaken by Aftenposten in 2010. The online newspaper vg.no is, however, by far the most visited in Norway, with 2 million daily readers.

VG Nett 
VG Nett is VGs news site online. It was started in 1995. VG Nett made a net operating profit of 40 percent in 2006, making it an unusually successful online media operation. According to figures from TNG Gallup, it had approximately 2 million daily readers in 2016.

VG's web pages also include a discussion forum, VG Debatt.

Circulation
Numbers from the Norwegian Media Businesses' Association, Mediebedriftenes Landsforening.

 1980: 200,536
 1981: 227,191
 1982: 240,302
 1983: 256,747
 1984: 269,140
 1985: 290,705
 1986: 317,049
 1987: 333,698
 1988: 345,636
 1989: 360,331
 1990: 367,036
 1991: 365,318
 1992: 374,092
 1993: 377,575
 1994: 386,137
 1995: 371,238
 1996: 356,861
 1997: 370,115
 1998: 364,619
 1999: 373,552
 2000: 375,983
 2001: 387,508
 2002: 390,510
 2003: 380,190
 2004: 365,266
 2005: 343,703
 2006: 315,549
 2007: 309,610
 2008: 284,414
 2009: 262,374
 2010: 233,295
 2011: 211,588
 2012: 188,345
 2013: 164,430
 2014: 138,188
 2015: 112,716
 2016: 93,883
 2017: 82,015
 2018: 96,405

See also
 List of Norwegian newspapers

References

External links

1945 establishments in Norway
Daily newspapers published in Norway
Newspapers established in 1945
Newspapers published in Oslo
Norwegian-language newspapers